Parkdale is an unincorporated community and census-designated place located within Manistee Township, Manistee County, Michigan, United States. Its population was 704 as of the 2010 census. The community is in the southwest corner of the township, on the northern edge of Manistee Lake where the Manistee River enters the lake. It is on US 31 near the junction with M-55 on the northern boundary of the Manistee city limits.

Geography

Demographics

History
The community had a rural post office from April 1897 to September 1898 and again from October 1898 to April 1900. From 1927 until 2003, Parkdale was the southern terminus of M-110.

References

Unincorporated communities in Manistee County, Michigan
Unincorporated communities in Michigan
Census-designated places in Manistee County, Michigan
Census-designated places in Michigan